Jim E. Peterson is the President of the Senate for the 62nd Montana Legislature.  Peterson has served in the Legislature since 2003 as a Republican.  He was elected for Senate District 15 in Buffalo, Montana.  Peterson is the primary sponsor for a joint bill 21 "Study of eminent domain and just compensation for property."

Peterson has received a varied education.  He attended Montana State University to study Animal Science and obtained a Master's in Agriculture from Texas A&M University.  He then studied Banking at Southern Methodist University and obtained an MBA in Finance at West Texas State University.

References

External links 
 Home page

Living people
Republican Party Montana state senators
Presidents of the Montana Senate
1946 births